Kensington is one of the northern suburbs of Cape Town.

References

Suburbs of Cape Town